The 2022 season was the 113th season in the history of Sport Club Corinthians Paulista. The season covered the period from January 2022 to November 2022, a shorter season due to the 2022 FIFA World Cup.

Background

Kits
 Home (26 April 2022 onward): White shirt, black shorts and white socks;
 Away (8 May 2022 onward): Black shirt, white shorts and black socks;
 Third (7 October 2022 onward): Beige shirt with shodō stripes, black shorts and beige socks.

Previous Kits
 Home (Until 25 April 2022): White shirt, black shorts and white socks;
 Away (Until 7 May 2022): Black with white stripes shirt, white shorts and black socks;
 Third (Until 6 October 2022): Purple shirt, purple shorts and purple socks.

Squad

Managerial changes
On February 2, Sylvinho was fired after losing a home match at the 2022 Campeonato Paulista against Santos at Neo Química Arena. Assistant coach Fernando Lázaro was announced as caretaker afterwards.

On February 23, Portuguese manager Vítor Pereira was announced as the club's new manager until the end of the season. He made his debut on March 5 against rivals São Paulo.

Transfers

Transfers in

Loans in

Transfers out

Loans out

Squad statistics

Overview

Campeonato Paulista

For the 2022 Campeonato Paulista, the 16 teams are divided in four groups of 4 teams (A, B, C, D). They faced all teams, except those that were in their own group, with the top two teams from each group qualifying for the quarterfinals. The two overall worst teams were relegated.

First stage

Knockout stages

Copa Libertadores

Group stage

Knockout stages

Campeonato Brasileiro

Results

Copa do Brasil

Preliminary stages

Knockout stages

See also
List of Sport Club Corinthians Paulista seasons

Notes

References

Sport Club Corinthians Paulista seasons
Corinthians